The discography of the Swedish alternative rock band Kent consists of twelve studio albums (with two of them also released in English), three compilation albums, one of whom is a box set, one EP, thirty-nine Swedish and six English singles.
The band consists of Joakim Berg (lead vocals and guitar), Martin Sköld (bass and keyboards), Sami Sirviö (lead guitar and keyboards), Markus Mustonen (drums, backing vocals, keyboards and piano)  and was founded in Eskilstuna in 1990.

Albums

Swedish studio albums

English studio albums

Compilation albums

Box sets

Extended plays

Singles

Swedish

English

Other charted songs 

Notes

D "2000" was written as the theme song for the Swedish TV-series Hemlös (Swedish for "Homeless"), and all proceeds were donated to the foundation for the homeless of Stockholm, Stockholms hemlösa.

Music videos 

Notes

E Kent held a contest where fans were asked to submit their own videos of "Vy från ett luftslott". The band chose five finalists out of 65 entries, and the winner was picked through a poll on the band's forum.

References

External links 
 

Discographies of Swedish artists
Rock music group discographies